The 2011 Horizon League baseball tournament took place from May 22 through 26, near the close of the 2011 NCAA Division I baseball season.  The top six of the league's seven teams met in the double-elimination tournament held at Wright State's Nischwitz Stadium in Dayton, Ohio.  Top seeded  won their fourth Horizon League Championship and earned the conference's automatic bid to the 2011 NCAA Division I baseball tournament.

Seeding
The league's six teams are seeded one through six based on winning percentage, using conference games only.

Results

All-Tournament Team
The following players were named to the All-Tournament Team.

Most Valuable Player
Zach Tanner was named Most Valuable Player of the Tournament.  Tanner was a third baseman for Wright State.

References

Tournament
Horizon League Baseball Tournament
Horizon League Baseball
Baseball in Dayton, Ohio
College baseball tournaments in Ohio
Sports competitions in Dayton, Ohio